Moneilema manni is a species of beetle in the family Cerambycidae. It was described by Psota in 1930.

References

Moneilemini
Beetles described in 1930